The Dauphine of France (also) was the wife of the Dauphin of France (the heir apparent to the French throne). The position was analogous to a crown princess (the wife of a crown prince and heir apparent to a throne).

List of Dauphines of France

House of Valois

House of Bourbon

See also
 Dauphine of Auvergne
 List of Angevin consorts
 Countesses and Duchesses of Maine
 List of consorts of Alençon
 List of consorts of Bourbon
 List of consorts of Vendôme
 Countess of Artois
 Countess of Provence
 List of consorts of Lorraine
 List of Princesses of Condé
 List of consorts of Montpensier
 List of consorts of Conti
 List of consorts of Étampes
 Countess of Évreux
 Countess of Champagne
 List of consorts of Joinville

Notes

 
 
Royal titles
French princesses